The Hueco Formation is a geologic formation in west Texas and southern New Mexico. It preserves fossils dating back to the early Permian period.

Description
It overlies the Panther Seep Formation with a slight disconformity, and its base is typically a thick biostromal limestone bed. The formation unconformably underlies the Wilkie Ranch Formation. It intertongues with the Abo Formation in the southern San Andres Mountains.

In the Robledo Mountains, the Hueco is promoted to group rank and divided into (in ascending stratigraphic order) the Shalem Colony, Community Pit, Robledo Mountains, and Apache Dam Formations. In the Hueco Mountains, the uppermost formation is the Alacran Mountain Formation.

The Hueco Formation is contemporary with the Abo Formation and represents continued marine sediment deposition south of the prograding Abo deltas.

History of investigation
The formation was first defined by G.B. Richardson in 1904, but mistakenly thought to be Pennsylvanian in age. Nelson dated the formation as earliest Permian in the Franklin Mountains in 1940. Spencer G. Lucas et al. promoted the formation to group rank in 1998.

See also

 List of fossiliferous stratigraphic units in Texas
 Paleontology in Texas

Footnotes

References
 
 
 
 

 
 
 
 
 

Limestone formations of the United States
Permian formations of New Mexico
Permian geology of Texas